Sir Frederick Leopold Arthur, 2nd Baronet (Plymouth, 20 December 1816 – 1 June 1878) was a British soldier.

The son of Sir George Arthur, 1st Bt and Eliza Orde Smith, he was commissioned into the 4th Foot in 1833. He transferred to the 40th Foot in 1850 and the 18th Hussars in 1863. He became a colonel, and succeeded to the baronetcy in 1854.

On 24 April 1856, he married Lady Elizabeth Hay-Drummond, daughter of the Earl of Kinnoull. They had three children:
 Frederica Louisa Juliana Arthur (d. 23 March 1946), married Alfred Darby
 Sir George Compton Archibald Arthur, 3rd Bt (1860–1946)
 Captain Leonard Robert Sunkersett Arthur, CMG (23 December 1864 – 13 December 1903), died unmarried

He is buried on the eastern edge of Brompton Cemetery in London with his sister, Isabella Maria Malton, his two sons, George* and Leonard, and Kate Harriet, George's* wife ( i.e. The wife of George* the son of Frederick).

References

1816 births
1878 deaths
Baronets in the Baronetage of the United Kingdom
King's Own Royal Regiment officers
South Lancashire Regiment officers
18th Royal Hussars officers